Arctaphaenops is a genus of beetles in the family Carabidae, containing the following species:

 Arctaphaenops angulipennis Meixner, 1925
 Arctaphaenops gaisbergeri Fischhuber, 1983
 Arctaphaenops muellneni Schmid, 1972

References

Trechinae